Mahdi Abbaszadeh is an Iranian philosopher and associate professor of epistemology at the Research Institute for Islamic Culture and Thought. He is a recipient of the Iranian Book of the Year Award for his book System of Illuminative Epistemology of Al-Suhrawardi.

Books
 Avicenna's Influence on Duns Scotus, 2013
 System of Illuminative Epistemology of Al-Suhrawardi, 2016
 Existential Theology: A Comparative and Critical Study of John Macquarrie's Thinking, 2017
 Philosophical Essays, 2020

References

External links
 Department of Epistomology at the Research Institute for Islamic Culture and Thought

Living people
21st-century Iranian philosophers
Academic staff of the Research Institute for Islamic Culture and Thought
Allameh Tabataba'i University alumni
Year of birth missing (living people)